William Lankford may refer to:

 William Chester Lankford (1877–1964), American politician
 Hasaan Ibn Ali (1931–1980), jazz pianist, whose birth name may have been William Henry Lankford